Bajagić may refer to:

Bajagić, Croatia, a village near Sinj
Momčilo Bajagić (born 1960), Serbian musician

Serbian surnames